The Copa del Generalísimo 1940 Final was the 38th final of the King's Cup. The final was played at Campo de Fútbol de Vallecas in Madrid, on 30 June 1940, being won by CD Español, who beat Madrid CF 3-2 after extra time.

Details

References

1940
Copa
RCD Espanyol matches
Real Madrid CF matches